Nantong Rail Transit is a rapid transit system in Nantong, Jiangsu Province, China.

In August 2014, China's National Development and Reform Commission approved Nantong Rail Transit's short-term (2014-2020) construction plan, including Line 1 and Line 2.

History 
In October 2011, the third meeting of the Standing Committee of the Municipal People's Congress of Nantong City heard the report of the municipal government on urban rail rapid transit construction planning, and launched the "Nantong Urban Rail Transit Planning Work" plan. In April 2012, the Nantong Rail Transit plan was released and circulated online.

On 19 August 2014, Nantong's urban rail rapid transit construction plan was approved by the National Development and Reform Commission, becoming the sixth in Jiangsu and the 37th city in mainland China approved for rapid transit.

Phase 1 of Nantong Rail Transit

Line 1

Line 1's construction began on 18 December 2017, and opened on 10 November 2022. Line 1 begins at Pingchao Station and ends at Zhenxing Lu Station.

Line 2
Construction for Line 2 began on 26 October 2018. Line 2 is 20.85 km in length with 17 stations. It is scheduled to open in March 2023.

Long-term planning 

References

External Links 
Nantong Metro from UrbanRail.Net

Rapid transit in China
Rail transport in Jiangsu
Nantong Rail Transit